Mongo is an unincorporated community in Springfield Township, LaGrange County, Indiana. The population in 2010 was 105.

History
Mongo was originally called Mongoquinong, and under the latter name was laid out in 1840. Mongoquinong was later shortened to Mongo.  Although An Illustrated Historical Atlas of LaGrange County, Indiana (1874) translates the native name as 'Big Squaw Village', it is thought to be a corruption of the Miami-Illinois , meaning 'in the Loon Land'.

The John O'Ferrell Store was listed in the National Register of Historic Places in 1975.

Geography
Mongo is the site of "The Olde Store" (aka "John O'Ferrell Store" or the "Mongo Trading Post"), on the National Register of Historic Places.

References

Unincorporated communities in LaGrange County, Indiana
Unincorporated communities in Indiana